Bonito is the fifth album by the Spanish Latin rock group Jarabe de Palo, released in August 2003.

Track listing 
 Intro - 0:33
 Yin Yang - 3:12
 Bonito - 4:13
 Aún No Me Toca - 3:12
 No Sé Estar Enamorado - 4:21
 Mira Como Viene - 4:45
 Cambia la Piel - 6:49
 Bailar - 3:15
 En Conexión - 3:39 
 Las Cruces de Tijuana - 3:48
 Como Peces en el Agua - 3:54
 Palabras Que Se Esconden - 2:45
 Camino - 3:30
 Emociones - 3:32
 Corazón - 6:28

Classroom Usage 
The song "Bonito", and often the music video associated with it, has undergone widespread playing in American classrooms, reaching cult-like status among Spanish students.

2003 albums
Jarabe de Palo albums